Deveney Marking Kelly is an American television soap opera director and former producer. On-screen, Deveney is credited as Deveney Kelly, but is also known as Deveney Marking.

Positions held
The Young and the Restless
 Occasional Director (2008, 2009)

The Bold and the Beautiful
 Director (1992–present)
 Producer (1996–1999)

Days of Our Lives
 Occasional Director (2005–2006)

Awards and nominations
Daytime Emmy Award
Nomination, 2006, Directing Team, The Bold and the Beautiful
Nomination, 2002, Directing Team, The Bold and the Beautiful
Nomination, 2000, Directing Team, The Bold and the Beautiful

Directors Guild of America Award
Nomination, 1997, Directing Team, The Bold and the Beautiful (episode #2681)

External links

Soap opera producers
American television directors
American television producers
American women television producers
Year of birth missing (living people)
Living people
American women television directors
21st-century American women